Eastern National was a bus company operating in south-east England, primarily in Essex, from 1929 to the 1990s.

Early history

Eastern National Omnibus Company commenced operating in 1929 as a joint venture between the London and North Eastern Railway, the London, Midland and Scottish Railway and the National Omnibus & Transport Company. The National company had originated in 1909 as the National Steam Car Company, operating steam bus services in London. The London services ceased in 1919, when the company was renamed National Omnibus & Transport Company. The company expanded outside London, first in Essex (1913), where the company bought the bus operations of the Great Eastern Railway around Chelmsford, and later in Bedfordshire (1919), Gloucestershire (1919), Somerset (1920), Dorset (1921), and Devon and Cornwall (1927). The National continued to expand in Essex, Hertfordshire and Bedfordshire.

The railways developed networks of feeder bus services in the 1920s, but the legal powers of the railway companies (after 1922 the Big Four) to run bus services were unclear and each promoted private legislation (the Road Powers Acts of 1928) to obtain clarity. One result was that the railways were in future to refrain from taking a controlling interest in bus undertakings. This led the companies to enter into partnerships with the bus companies, including the National.  In 1929 the London and North Eastern Railway, the London, Midland and Scottish Railway and the National formed Eastern National Omnibus Company, to which all three shareholders transferred their bus operations in Essex, Hertfordshire, Buckinghamshire, Bedfordshire and Huntingdonshire.

In 1931, a controlling interest in the National Omnibus was acquired by the Tilling Group. From then on Eastern National was run as a Tilling company, although the railways retained their shares until 1948.

Nationalisation
In 1948, the railways were nationalised and, shortly after, the Tilling Group sold its bus interests to the government. Eastern National therefore became a state-owned company, under the control of the British Transport Commission.

The new regime resulted in rationalisation of the company's area of operations. In 1952, the company's operations in Bedfordshire, Buckinghamshire, North Hertfordshire and Huntingdonshire were transferred to United Counties,; control of Westcliff Motor Services was transferred to Eastern National.

On 1 January 1963, Eastern National was included in the transfer of the British Transport Commission's transport assets to the state-owned Transport Holding Company, which in turn passed to the state-owned National Bus Company on 1 January 1969.

In 1964 it advertised the following Express Services:-
X1 London - Rayleigh - Southend-on-sea
X10 London - Basildon - Southend-on-sea
X11 Enfield - Basildon - Southend-on-sea
X12 London - Colchester - Clacton - Jaywick Sands
X14 London - Braintree - Halstead - Sudbury .. Hadleigh, Sudbury, Bury St Edmunds
X20 Southend - Basildon - Wrotham - Tonbridge - Tunbridge Wells - Brighton - Worthing
X21 Southend - Basildon -  Wrotham - Tonbridge - Tunbridge Wells - Hailsham - Eastbourne
X22 Southend - Basildon - Rochester - Faversham, Canterbury - Dover and Folkestone
X23 Southend - Basildon - Maidstone - Battle - Hastings - Eastbourne
X24 Southend - Basildon - Sittingbourne - Faversham - Canterbury - Margate - Ramsgate
X25 Southend - Basildon - Colchester - Lowestoft - Gorleston - Great Yarmouth
X26 Southend - Basildon - Romford - Southampton - Bournemouth / Isle of Wight (using Red Funnel Steamer)
X27 Southend - Colchester - Jaywick Sands, Clacton-on-sea - Holland-on-sea - Frinton-on-sea - Walton-on-naze
X28 Southend - Chelmsford - Dunmow - Cambridge (connections to Midland Red for Northampton, Rugby, Coventry and Birmingham)
X29 Southend - Basildon - Harlow - Hertford - Stamford - Oakham - Nottingham - Derby
X30 Southsea - Portsmouth - Bognor-Regis - Crawley - Dartford - Basildon - Southend
X32/X34 Clacton - Colchester - Chelmsford - Basildon - Sittingbourne, Faversham, Canterbury, Birchington, Margate .. Ramsgate - Dover - Folkestone
X33 Walton - Clacton - Colchester - Chelmsford - Basildon - Dartford - Medway Towns - Maidstone - Hastings
X40 Tilbury ferry- Basildon - Lowestoft - Gorlestone - Great Yarmouth

Privatisation
As part of the privatisation of the National Bus Company, Eastern National was sold in a management buyout. In 1990, Eastern National passed to Badgerline.

Badgerline divided the company into two: Thamesway Buses in the south of Essex and Eastern National in the north. Eastern National was included in the June 1995 merger of Badgerline with GRT Group to form FirstBus. FirstBus combined the two operations and renamed the company First Essex.

Depots
The following locations hosted depots to maintain Eastern National's fleet:

Brentwood (BD)
Brentwood depot was a small site, located near to the High Street on North Road.

Braintree (BE)
Braintree depot was situated on Fairfield Road, in Braintree town centre.

Fairfield Road had originally been used by Hicks Brothers, a bus operator which Eastern National took over in 1949. A house adjacent to the old depot site survives, to remind us of a link with the Hicks era.

Basildon (BN)
Basildon depot is located on Cherrydown East, near to Basildon railway station. It was opened by Eastern National in 1961 to replace premises at Bull Road, Vange.

Chelmsford (CF)
Chelmsford depot was located on New Writtle Street, with some maintenance duties carried out at the 1930s bus station on Duke Street.

Chelmsford had an outstation at Great Dunmow (DW).

Clacton (CN)
Clacton depot had been sited at Telford Road, on the Gorse Lane industrial estate, since 1988 at premises previously occupied by Coastal Red, a one-time competitor on the Tendring peninsular who were later bought by Eastern National. Telford Road replaced the garage at Castle Road, near Clacton town centre, which was later redeveloped as flats.

There was an outstation of Clacton at Walton-on-the-Naze, until May 1996. This was a small garage at Kino Road, just off the seafront, and housed four vehicles. Walton had the depot code of WN and was demolished in 1998, with bungalows built on the site. However, the enquiry office survives as a gift shop.

The predecessor of Walton garage was Warners Iron Foundry at Naze Park Road, a building stands to this day. This had its origins with Silver Queen.

Colchester (CR)
Colchester garage was located on Queen Street, which was on the site of the Theatre Royal that burned down circa 1917.

Until 1973, Eastern National had a one bus outstation at West Mersea, acquired from Primrose Bus Service in 1935. The building there survive, but, in 1979, it was heavily modified to become part of a new leisure centre. Service buses still terminate outside and locals still refer to it as West Mersea bus station.

Until 1969, Eastern National also had a one bus outstation in Victoria Place, Brightlingsea. This was acquired with the business of Berry & Sons in 1937.

Canvey Island (CY)
Canvey (CY) depot closed in April 1978 and has since has since become a transport museum.

Dovercourt / Harwich (DT)

Harwich depot at Harwich Bus Station, off Main Road, was opened by Eastern National in 1974. It replaced the old Dovercourt depot at Kingsway, whose building is now used as a public library.

Hadleigh (HH)
Hadleigh garage is located on London Road, just west of Hadleigh shopping centre. It is a former Westcliff-on-Sea Motor Services depot, controlled by Eastern National from 1955.

Hadleigh expanded its operations in 1992, after Southend's Prittlewell depot was closed.

Maldon (MN)
Maldon was a full depot until 1993, when it became an outstation. South Woodham Ferrers (SW) was an outstation with the allocation of one bus in the late 1980s.

Southend (SD)
Southend (SD) depot was originally sited on London Road, but closed in 1987 and has now disappeared under a Sainsbury's store. Operations moved to a new site in Prittlewell.

Walthamstow (WW)
This depot was opened to support the CityBus operations in east London. Ponders End (PD) was an outstation.

References

External links

1929 establishments in England
Former bus operators in Bedfordshire
Former bus operators in Buckinghamshire
Former bus operators in Essex
Former bus operators in Hertfordshire